Renu Raj (born 11 January 1987) is an Indian Administrative Service officer and a medical doctor from Kerala. She is currently serving as the District Collector of Wayanad.

She belongs to the 2016 batch of the Kerala Cadre. She is the former collector of Ernakulam and Sub collector of Munnar. She has secured 2nd rank in civil service examination conducted by the union public service commission (upsc).

Career

Personal Life

Controversies 

 Brahmapuram Fire incident: The Brahmapuram incident refers to a major fire that broke out at the Brahmapuram waste treatment plant in Kochi, Kerala, India, on March 2, 2023. The plant, which is run by the Kochi Corporation, is responsible for treating the solid waste generated in the city and converting it into electricity. The fire at the plant started in the early hours of March 2, and it took several days for firefighters to bring it under control. It was also reported that the fire had led to a release of toxic fumes, which had resulted in the evacuation of nearby residents. The mishap exposed the mismanagement of solid waste and, according to critics, also pointed to the inherent corruption in the system. Kerala high court had criticised the action taken by Ernakulam district administration to douse Brahmapuram waste plant fire. The move comes after the High Court order expressed displeasure over the Collector Renu Raj's absence during the hearing of a suo moto notice related to Brahmapuram waste plant fire in Kochi. She is transferred and posted as District Collector of Wayanad.
 Munnar Anti Encroachment Drive: In 2019, there was a controversy related to her transfer from the post of Devikulam Sub-Collector.
The controversy arose after Renu Raj reportedly took action against some encroachments and illegal constructions in Munnar, which led to protests by local business owners and politicians who were allegedly involved in the encroachments. She also reportedly took action against the illegal construction of a resort owned by a prominent businessman in the area.

Some media reports claimed that Renu Raj was transferred from her post as a result of pressure from these influential individuals. However, the Kerala government denied these allegations and stated that her transfer was part of a routine administrative reshuffle. The controversy surrounding Renu Raj's transfer led to widespread public debate in Kerala, with many people expressing support for her actions against illegal encroachments and constructions in Munnar. Some civil society groups also launched campaigns to support her and demand action against those responsible for the illegal encroachments.

References

Indian women
1987 births
Living people